Speed skating at the 2020 Winter Youth Olympics took place at Lake St. Moritz in St. Moritz, Switzerland from  12 to 16 January 2020.

Unique to the Youth Olympic Games is a mixed NOC team sprint competition.

Medal summary

Medal table

Boys' events

Girls' events

Mixed event

Qualification system
The overall quota for the Speed skating competition is 64 total skaters, consisting of 32 men and 32 ladies. Each National Olympic Committee (NOC) could send a maximum of six athletes (three per gender) to the Winter Youth Olympic Games but the maximum number of entries per event is two. Skaters are eligible to participate at the 2020 Winter Youth Olympics if they were born between 1 January 2002 and 31 December 2004.

The top six athletes, per gender, based on the results of the 2019 World Junior Speed Skating Championships in the 500 and 1500 meters entitled to one quota. Each NOC can receive up to two quotas based on the 2019 World Junior Championships. The remaining quota will be allocated based on the ISU Junior World Cup Speed Skating ranking. The allocation of quotas will be carried out under four restrictions: 
 the allocation will be disregarded the highest ranked NOC skaters in equal number to the quota the NOCs have already received.
 only the highest distance rank of each skater will be considered.
 NOC that did not qualify or qualified one quota will get priority before allocation of a third quota to other NOC.
 The host nation has the right to enter one athlete in each event if not qualified.

Qualification summary

Quota Allocation
Based on the results of the 2019 World Junior Speed Skating Championships the following countries have earned YOG quota places. The final allocation of quotas was announced by the ISU on November 29, 2019.

References

External links
Results Book – Speed Skating

 
2020 Winter Youth Olympics events
Youth Olympics
Youth Olympics, 2020
2020